Tineola anaphecola is a species of fungus moth. It is native to tropical the Democratic Republic of the Congo.

The larvae live in the big conglomerates of webby cocoons of the moth Anaphe panda, feeding on undefined decaying animal matter.

References 

Tineinae
Moths described in 1967
Endemic fauna of the Democratic Republic of the Congo